Stefano La Colla is an Italian tenor who has given recitals and performed in opera internationally.

Biography 
He was born in Turin, but he is native from Alcamo, where he lived from 12 until he was 23;  he started his studies at the Conservatorio Pietro Mascagni in Livorno and trained under the guide of the soprano Luciana Serra and later with the baritone Carlo Meliciani.

In 2002 he won  a scholarship at the Accademia d’alto Perfezionamento del Repertorio Pucciniano of Torre del Lago, where he attended its courses with Magda Olivero, Katia Ricciarelli and Raina Kabaivanska.  Afterwards he performed together with Katia Ricciarelli at the Teatro Verdi of  Pisa in a gala event organized by the Rotary Club.

After a great debut in 2008 with Aida at the Theatre Goldoni in Leghorn, he has continued his artistic experience in the traditional theatres of many Italian cities such as Novara, Savona, Chieti, Reggio Emilia, Pisa, Lucca, Livorno, Busseto and Brescia.

His international career started in 2011 with Turandot in Ratisbon (where he  made his debut with 16 recitals), then in Dortmund, Leipzig, Saint Petersburg, St. Gallen, Zagabria, Bucarest; however, the real turning point was in 2014 as he performed in the greatest European  opera houses such as Hamburg, Berlin, Munich, Amsterdam, Oslo, Dresden and Vienna.
In Italy he has performed several times at Teatro alla Scala in Milan as well as in Rome, Naples and Verona.

Prizes and appreciations 
 2002:  winner of a scholarship at the Accademia d’Alto Perfezionamento del Repertorio Pucciniano di Torre del Lago
 2006: winner of the International Contest Ismaele Voltolini at Buscoldo (Mantua)

Performances 
2014
 Manon Lescaut	(Renato Des Grieux) Oper Leipzig (February–May)
 La Gioconda	(Enzo Grimaldi)	Theater St. Gallen  (February–May)
 Tosca	(Cavaradossi)   Deutsche Oper Berlin (May)
 Macbeth	(Macduff) Opera Wrocławska (June)
 Un ballo in maschera	(Riccardo)  Theater Dortmund (Sept.-Oct.)
 Manon Lescaut	(Il Cavaliere des Grieux) at the Mikhailovsky Theatre of Saint Petersburg (Oct. 2014 – Apr. 2015)
2015
 Manon Lescaut	(Il Cavaliere des Grieux)  Oper Leipzig (Jan.–Apr.)
 Turandot	(Calaf)   Teatro di San Carlo, Naples (March–April)
 Tosca	(Cavaradossi)	  Teatro dell'Opera di Roma (March–June)
 Turandot	(Calaf)   Teatro alla Scala, Milan (May)
 Cavalleria rusticana	(Turiddu) Teatro alla Scala, Milan (June)
 Nabucco	(Ismaele)     Deutsche Oper Berlin (June)
 Tosca	(Cavaradossi)      Teatro San Carlo, Naples (July)
 Turandot	(Calaf)    Teatro dell'Opera of Rome (July–August)
 Turandot	(Calaf)   Deutsche Oper Berlin (Sept.-Nov.)
 Manon Lescaut	(Il Cavaliere des Grieux) Deutsche Oper Berlin (November 2015 – March 2016)
 Tosca	(Cavaradossi)   Teatro dell'Opera of Rome (December)
2016
 Tosca	(Cavaradossi)	 Theater St Gallen (January–May)
 Concert	(Tenore) Deutsche Oper am Rhein, Düsseldorf (March)
 Tosca	(Cavaradossi)	Opéra de Toulon (April)
 Madama Butterfly	(F B Pinkerton)   Staatsoper Unter den Linden, Berlin (April–May)
 Le Cid    (Rodrigue)   Theater St Gallen (June–July)
 Aida	    (Radamès)    Fondazione Arena di Verona (June–August)
 Aida	    (Radamès)	Teatro di San Carlo, Naples (July–August)
 Turandot  (Calaf)	Wiener Staatsoper, Vienna (September 2016 – March 2017)
 Manon Lescaut	(Il Cavaliere Renato des Grieux)  De Nationale Opera, Amsterdam (October)
 Turandot	(Il principe ignoto)   Bayerische Staatsoper of Munich (December)
2017
 Il trovatore	         Teatro Calderón, Valladolid (February)
 Cavalleria rusticana	(Turiddu)   Opéra National du Rhin, Strasburg (June)
 Pagliacci   (Canio)	 Opéra National du Rhin, Strasburg (June)
 Turandot   (Calaf)      Festival Puccini 2017 di Torre del Lago (July)
 Aida	     (Radamès)	 Macerata Opera Festival (July–August)
 Nabucco    (Ismaele)	 Teatro alla Scala, Milan (Oct.–Nov.)

References

Sources

External links 

Stefano La Colla Operabase

People from Alcamo
Italian tenors
21st-century Italian male  opera singers
Living people
Year of birth missing (living people)